This article lists Foreign Ministers of Prussia. After the creation of the German Empire in 1871, the Imperial Chancellor was normally also Foreign Minister of Prussia. However, during the chancellorship of Prince Hohenlohe (1894–1900), the position was held by the State Secretaries for Foreign Affairs.

Prussian Ministers of Foreign Affairs, 1768–1918
Ewald Friedrich von Hertzberg 1768–1791
Count August Friedrich Ferdinand von der Goltz 1808–1814
Prince Karl August von Hardenberg 1814–1818
Count Christian Günther Bernstorff 1818–1832
Friedrich Ancillon 1832–1837
Baron Heinrich Wilhelm Werther 1837–1841
Count Mortimer Maltzan 1841–1842
Baron Heinrich von Bülow 1842–1845
Baron Karl Ernst Wilhelm von Canitz und Dallwitz 1845–1848
Count Adolf Heinrich Arnim-Boitzenburg 19 – 21 March 1848
Baron Heinrich Alexander von Arnim 21 March – 20 June 1848
Baron Alexander von Schleinitz 20 – 27 June 1848
Rudolf von Auerswald 27 June – 7 September 1848
August Heinrich Hermann von Dönhoff 7 September – 2 November 1848
Count Friedrich Wilhelm von Brandenburg 20 November – December 1848
 December 1848 – 23 February 1849
Count Heinrich Friedrich von Arnim-Heinrichsdorff 24 February – 3 May 1849
Count Friedrich Wilhelm von Brandenburg 3 May – July 1849
Baron Alexander von Schleinitz 3 July 1849 – 26 September 1850
Joseph von Radowitz 26 September – 2 November 1850
Baron Otto Theodor von Manteuffel 2 November 1850 – 5 September 1858
Baron Alexander von Schleinitz 5 September 1858 – 12 July 1861
Count Albrecht von Bernstorff 10 October 1861 – 8 October 1862
Prince Otto von Bismarck 23 November 1862 – 20 March 1890
Count Leo von Caprivi 20 March 1890 – 29 October 1894
Baron Adolf Hermann Marschall von Bieberstein 29 October 1894 – 19 October 1897
Prince Bernhard von Bülow 19 October 1897 – 10 July 1909
Theobald von Bethmann Hollweg 14 July 1909 – 13 July 1917
Georg Michaelis 16 July – 2 December 1917
Count Georg von Hertling 2 December 1917 – 3 October 1918
Prince Maximilian of Baden 3 October – 9 November 1918

See also
Foreign Minister of Germany
Foreign Minister of Bavaria
Minister President of Prussia

Prussia
Foreign